Madonna's life and work has generated various academics works, which includes scholarly articles and other published works, mostly covered by literary and academic journals as well as by others educational publishers like those from university pressess. The list is limited to only those that appeared first by a peer-reviewed outlet, or published in compendiums. Also, these works have been published in different languages other than English.

First scholarly articles about her is believed to be dated on 1985. Scholar Suzanna Danuta Walters commented that academic writings about her, "has produced at least one major academic text devoted to Madonna", while for professor Jane Desmond, "the relevant bibliography is vast". Australian historian Robert Aldrich once commented she is a "performer of inimitable ubiquity" in the academia as she "has saturated the pages of academic journals". To Alina Simone, in her academic studies "there is no dearth of material about Madonna, but an overwhelming excess". Associate professor José F. Blanco, wrote in The Journal of Popular Culture that  "it can be argued that Madonna is overexposed in academic research".

Thesis such as Like a thesis: postmodern readings of Madonna music videos (1991) by Madonna scholar, Charles W Wells are included because received academic and press coverage. In 1998, French academic Georges-Claude Guilbert wrote his thesis Madonna: un mythe postmoderne. Others of these publications received citations from other scholars and observers appearing in citation indexes, or were preserved by university libraries. In addition, others thesis were published as books. Music professor Antoni Pizà noted that during the late 20th century, it became a fad in the United States to write doctoral dissertations on Madonna. American journalist Hank Stuever said that Madonna's dissertations piled up and some were collected into a tome called The Madonna Connection (1993). She has been part of multiple lectures around the world.

Academic and critical journal articles

In English

Non-English

Partial and secondary

Conferences, congresses, seminar and courses
Madonna has been part of multiple lectures around the world. Following, a few examples:

Theses and dissertations

Non-English thesis and dissertations

Notes

References

Book sources

 
 
 
 
 
 
 
 

Bibliographies of people
Academic publishing works